The Arab Cross Country Championships is an international competition in cross country running between Arabic countries. Organised by the Arab Athletics Federation, it was first contested in 1978 and held its twentieth edition in 2013. Originally hosted on an annual basis, then a biennial schedule from 1990 to 2002, the competition has not been held at regular intervals in recent years.

It features four races, which all combine an individual and team element. There is a men's long race, a women's long race, and two shorter races for both sexes in an under-20 (junior) category. The first three editions of the championships had senior races only and a men's junior race was introduced in 1982. The women's junior race followed in 1986. Short races for the senior athletes were also previously held (starting in 2000) but these were dropped after the discipline stopped being held at the IAAF World Cross Country Championships after 2006.

It is the third most prominent athletics tournament for Arab athletes, after the Arab Athletics Championships and the Athletics at the Pan Arab Games.

Past winners

Short course

References

List of winners
Pan Arab Cross Country Championships. GBR Athletics. Retrieved on 2013-09-28.

External links
Official website for Arab Athletics 

Cross Country Championships
Cross country running competitions
Recurring sporting events established in 1978
Athletics team events
Biennial athletics competitions